Cultural Policy Research (or Cultural Policy Studies) is a field of academic inquiry that grew out of Cultural Studies in the 1990s. A quarter of a century later, by now both “Cultural Policy Research” and "Cultural Policy Studies" each match almost 100 million entries in the World Wide Web.

Cultural Policy Research grew out of the idea that cultural studies should not only be critical, but also try to be useful. The Princeton University e.g. founded its Center for Arts and Cultural Policy Studies 1994 “to improve the clarity, accuracy and sophistication of discourse about the nation's artistic and cultural life.”

The scientific approach is genuinely interdisciplinary, combining social sciences, a wide range of the humanities, jurisprudence and economics. As all political sciences do, the research focuses on the content dimension (policy), the formal-institutional dimension (polity) and the practical dimension (politics), particularly affecting decision processes and the results obtained. Cultural Policy Research asks: What do the actors and agents in the Cultural Policy sphere actually do when they do what they do? Which purposes they do pursue by that? What are their goals and which means do they use? What is the result of their action for society and for the citizens’ intellectual and artistic freedom?

Among the many departments of Cultural Policy Studies around the world, there are several UNESCO Chairs in Cultural Policy from the programme launched in 1992 by the UNESCO to promote international inter-university cooperation:

 (412) Vilnius, Lithuania :UNESCO Chair in Cultural Policy and Cultural Management (1998), Vilnius Academy of Arts
 (436) Debrecen, Hungary: UNESCO Chair in Cultural Policy and Cultural Management (1999), Lajos Kossuth University of Arts and Sciences, Debrecen
 (454) Lomé, Togo: Chaire UNESCO sur les politiques culturelles pour le développement (1999), Centre régional d'action culturelle (CRAC)
 (527) Girona, Spain / Catalunya: Chaire UNESCO en matière de Politiques et de Coopération Culturelles (2001), Universitat de Girona
 (546) Barcelona, Spain / Catalunya: Chaire UNESCO d'études interculturelles (2001), Université Pompeu Febra de Barcelone
 (572) Barcelona, Spain / Catalunya: Chaire UNESCO de Diversité linguistique et culturelle (2002), Institut d'Etudes catalanes
 (654) Thessaloniki, Greece: Chaire UNESCO de politique interculturelle pour une citoyenneté active et solidaire (2004), Université de Macédoine
 (827) Kazan, Russia-Tatarstan: UNESCO Chair in Eurosian studies, Cultural Diversity and Cultural Policies (2008), Kazan State University
 (851) Buenos Aires, Argentine: Chaire UNESCO d’esthétique et sociologie de la différence et de la diversité culturelle en Argentine (2009), Universidad Nacional Tres de Febrero
 (978) Hildesheim, Germany: UNESCO Chair in Cultural Policy for the Arts in Development ”(2012), Department of Cultural Policy at University of Hildesheim.

Links 

 Compendium of Cultural Policies and Trends in Europe edited by the Council of Europe Strasbourg

The European Journal of Cultural Policy (1994 - 1997), now named International Journal of Cultural Policy (1997 - current) edited by the Centre for Cultural Policy Studies University of Warwick.

References 

Cultural studies